Ernst Arne Karlsson (born 23 March 1936) is a retired Swedish sailor. He was a crew member of the Swedish boat Rush VII that won the silver medal in the 5.5 m class at the 1964 Summer Olympics. His father Hjalmar and younger brother Per-Olof were also Olympic sailors.

References

External links
 
 
 

1936 births
Living people
Swedish male sailors (sport)
Royal Swedish Yacht Club sailors
Olympic sailors of Sweden
Olympic silver medalists for Sweden
Olympic medalists in sailing
Sailors at the 1964 Summer Olympics – 5.5 Metre
Medalists at the 1964 Summer Olympics
Sportspeople from Örebro